Gamma is the third letter of the Greek alphabet.

Gamma may also refer to:

Science and mathematics

General
Gamma wave, a type of brain wave
Latin gamma, used as an IPA symbol for voiced velar fricative and in the alphabets of African languages
Tropical Storm Gamma (2005), a 2005 Tropical Storm, that made landfall in Honduras
Tropical Storm Gamma (2020), a 2020 Tropical Storm, that made landfall on the Yucatán Peninsula
GAMMA, an extensive air shower array in Armenia
SARS-CoV-2 Gamma variant, one of the variants of SARS-CoV-2, the virus that causes COVID-19

Medicine
Gamma-glutamyltransferase (GGT), is a transferase present in the cell membranes of many tissues

Lower case, γ
Gamma correction, a property of images and video displays
Euler's constant, a mathematical constant
Gamma test (statistics), sometimes called Goodman and Kruskal's gamma, a non-parametric statistical test for strength of association.
Gamma ray, also gamma radiation, an electromagnetic ray
Photon, seen as an elementary particle in physics
Propagation constant of an electromagnetic wave
The third-brightest star of a constellation, in Bayer designation
Adiabatic index or heat capacity ratio, the ratio of the heat capacity at constant pressure to that at constant volume
In engineering, used to denote
Shear strain
Surface tension
Body effect on threshold voltage in field-effect transistor technology
gamma-Hydroxybutyric acid, a narcotic (GHB)
Lindane or gamma-hexachlorocyclohexane, an insecticide
Lorentz factor in relativity theory and astronomy
Gamma (eclipse) denotes how central (how close to the middle of the body) an eclipse is.
Voiced velar fricative in phonetics
Non-SI unit of magnetic flux density, 1nT

Upper case, Γ
Gamma distribution, a probability distribution function
Gamma function, a mathematical function
P-adic gamma function, a mathematical function
Christoffel symbols in general relativity
Circulation (fluid dynamics)
Reflection coefficient in electrical engineering
Gamma (finance), a second order derivative of an option pricing formula
Center of the Brillouin zone
Feferman–Schütte ordinal Γ0
The representation of a molecule's symmetry elements in inorganic chemistry
Decay width of a particle in high-energy physics
Typing environment within a type system

Technology
Gamma software, a stage in the software release life cycle
Gamma correction, in video, graphics, color spaces, and photographic imaging
Elias gamma coding, in computer science, encoding, compression
GM Gamma platform, a subcompact automobile platform by General Motors
Bristol Siddeley Gamma, a family of British rocket engines
Hyundai Gamma engine, a family of 1.6 L gasoline inline-4 engines
Suzuki RG250 Gamma, a two-stroke motorcycle

Companies 
Gamma (store), a Dutch hardware-store chain
Gamma Group, developers of FinFisher and associated suites of malware

Organizations 
Groupe des Architectes Modernes Marocains, an architecture collective in Morocco

Popular culture
Gamma (agency), a French photo agency
Gamma (band), American rock band
Gamma (miniseries), a 1975 Italian television miniseries
Gamma (wrestler), a Japanese professional wrestler working for the Dragon Gate promotion
E-102 Gamma, one of the E-Series characters in the Sonic the Hedgehog franchise
Γ, the emblem of the character Waluigi in the Mario franchise
Gamma Akutabi, a fictional character from the manga Zombiepowder.
Gamma Metroids, an evolution of the Metroid species from the game Metroid II: Return of Samus
Gamma radiation, responsible for creation of, and the power source to, The Incredible Hulk and derivative characters
Gamma chord, a type of musical chord
The Gamma People, a 1956 British-American film
Colony Gamma, a location in Xenoblade Chronicles 3

Other 
 Gamma, a classification of sensitive compartmented information
Gamma, Missouri, a community in the United States
Gamma Island (Greenland)
Hizaki Gamma, Japanese VTuber (hololive Production)

See also
Gama (disambiguation)
Gamma ray (disambiguation)